Anemone hortensis, commonly called broad-leaved anemone, is a perennial herbaceous flowering plant with an underground rhizome, in buttercup family Ranunculaceae. The genus name comes from the Greek ἄνεμος (ánemos, meaning "wind"), as an ancient legend tells that the flowers open only when the wind blows. The species name hortensis (from Latin hortus, meaning "vegetable garden") refers to the easiness with which this plant can be cultivated.

Description
Anemone hortensis reaches on average  of height. The stem is erect and pubescent. They have 12-20 lanceolate and acute petals, with numerous bluish or violet stamens and blue anthers. The flowering period extends from March through May. This plant is pollinated by wind or dispersed by animals.

Gallery

Distribution
This plant is endemic to Mediterranean basin and it is distributed in France, Italy, Greece, Albania, Bulgaria, Serbia, Croatia, North Macedonia Montenegro and Turkey

Habitat
They are found in  woods, vineyards, lawns and bushes.

References

 "Botanica. The Illustrated AZ of over 10000 garden plants and how to cultivate them", p. 92. Könemann, 2004.  
 Pignatti S. - Flora d'Italia - Edagricole – 1982 – Vol. I, pag. 293

External links
 Biolib

hortensis
Flora of Europe
Flora of Italy
Plants described in 1753
Taxa named by Carl Linnaeus